Tanielu "Daniel" Ekuale (born January 13, 1994) is a Samoan American football defensive tackle for the New England Patriots of the National Football League (NFL). He played college football at Washington State.

Early life and high school
Ekuale was born and grew in Pago Pago, American Samoa and attended Nuʻuuli Vocational Technical High School. He was rated the best college prospect for his class in American Samoa by most recruiting services and committed to play college football at Washington State University over offers from Oregon, Oregon State and Washington and after originally committing to play at Hawaii.

College career
Ekuale was a member of the Washington State Cougars for five seasons, redshirting his true freshman season. He became a starter at nose tackle for the Cougars during his redshirt junior season, recording a career-high 23 tackles (2.5 for loss) and a sack. Ekuale entered his redshirt senior season on the watch list for the Polynesian College Football Player of the Year and made 17 tackles (3.5 for loss) and one sack while starting 12 of WSU's 13 games. He finished his collegiate career with 71 total tackles (14 for loss) with three sacks and two forced fumbles.

Professional career

Cleveland Browns
Ekuale signed with the Cleveland Browns as an undrafted free agent on May 4, 2018. He was waived at the end of training camp but re-signed to the Browns' practice squad on September 2, 2018. Ekuale was removed from the practice squad on December 6, 2018, after receiving a four-game suspension for violating the NFL's performance-enhancing substance policy.

Ekuale signed a reserve/future contract with the Browns on January 2, 2019, and made the 53-man roster out of training camp. Ekuale made his NFL debut on September 8, 2019, against the Tennessee Titans. The Browns placed Ekuale on injured reserve after sustaining a calf injury while playing against the New England Patriots in Week 8. He finished the season with four tackles, one for a loss, in seven games played.

Ekuale was waived by the Browns on September 5, 2020.

Jacksonville Jaguars
On September 8, 2020, Ekuale was signed to the Jacksonville Jaguars practice squad. He was promoted to the active roster on September 28, 2020.

In Week 13 against the Minnesota Vikings, Ekuale recorded his first career sack on Kirk Cousins during the 27–24 overtime loss. 

On August 31, 2021, Ekuale was waived by the Jaguars.

New England Patriots
On September 5, 2021, the New England Patriots signed Ekuale to the practice squad. Ekuale spent the entire 2021 regular season on the Patriots' practice squad, but was elevated to the 53-man roster a total of eight times. On December 6, 2021, Ekuale had 2 tackles and sack in the Patriots 14-10 win over the Buffalo Bills. He signed a reserve/future contract with the Patriots on January 25, 2022.

Ekuale was suspended the first two games of the 2022 season.

References

External links 
Cleveland Browns bio
Washington State Cougars bio

1994 births
Living people
American football defensive tackles
Cleveland Browns players
Jacksonville Jaguars players
New England Patriots players
Players of American football from American Samoa
People from Pago Pago
Washington State Cougars football players